Bailar ("dance" in Spanish) may refer to:

People 
 Barbara A. Bailar (born 1935), American statistician
 Benjamin F. Bailar (1934-2017), US Postmaster General from 1975 to 1978
 Gregor Bailar (born 1963), American technology executive
 John C. Bailar Jr. (1904-1991), American chemist and professor
 John C. Bailar III (1932–2016), American statistician
 Schuyler Bailar (born 1996), American swimmer

Other uses 
 "Bailar" (song), by DJ Deorro
 Bailar twist, a chemical mechanism
 Bailar, Iran, a village in Qazvin Province